Euphemia of Pomerania (1285 – 26 July 1330) was Queen of Denmark as the spouse of King Christopher II. She was the daughter of Bogislaw IV, Duke of Pomerania, and his second spouse, Margarete of Rügen.

Euphemia wed Christopher in 1300. The marriage was likely a politically arranged marriage to provide Christopher with political support from the dynasty of her mother as well as that of her father. Not much is known about queen Euphemia.

Euphemia had at least six known children:

Margarete (1305–1340), married Louis V, Duke of Bavaria
Erik (1307–1331)
Otto, Duke of Lolland and Estonia (born c. 1310 – died after 1347)
Agnes (d. 1312), died young
Heilwig (born c. 1315)
Valdemar, King of Denmark (1320–1375)

She is buried in the Sorø Abbey.

References

 Alf Henrikson: Dansk historia (Danish history) (1989) (Swedish)
 Sven Rosborn (In Swedish): När hände vad i Nordens historia (When did what happen in the historiy of the Nordic countries) (1997)
 Den store danske encyklopædi Eufemia_af_Pommern
 https://web.archive.org/web/20110604072630/http://runeberg.org/nfad/0404.html
 http://runeberg.org/dbl/4/0621.html

	

1285 births
1330 deaths
Danish royal consorts
House of Griffins
Burials at Sorø Abbey
Place of birth missing
Place of death missing
14th-century Danish women
14th-century Danish people
13th-century Danish women
13th-century Danish people